The 1994 Texas Tech Red Raiders football team represented Texas Tech University as a member of the Southwest Conference (SWC) during the 1994 NCAA Division I-A football season. In their eighth season under head coach Spike Dykes, the Red Raiders compiled a 6–6 record (4–3 against SWC opponents) and finished in a five-way tie for second place in the conference. However, Texas A&M was on probation and ineligible for the conference championship or post-season play, which meant that the Red Raiders were awarded a share of the SWC championship. Per SWC rules, Texas Tech was selected to represent the conference in the 1995 Cotton Bowl Classic since the Red Raiders had not played in the bowl game since 1939, and had never played in the game as a member of the SWC. Tech outscored opponents by a combined total of 312 to 246. The team played its home games at Clifford B. and Audrey Jones Stadium in Lubbock, Texas.

Schedule

Roster

Game summaries

Nebraska

USC (Cotton Bowl Classic)

References

Texas Tech
Texas Tech Red Raiders football seasons
Texas Tech Red Raiders football